Willowbrook, Illinois may refer to:
Willowbrook, DuPage County, Illinois
Willow Brook Estates, Illinois

nl:Willowbrook (Illinois)